Bona Arsenault,  (October 4, 1903 – July 4, 1993) was a Canadian historian, genealogist and a federal and provincial politician.

Born in Bonaventure, Quebec, the son of Joseph-Georges Arsenault and Marcelline Gauthier, he studied at Université Laval and University of Connecticut.

In the 1931 Quebec provincial elections, he ran unsuccessfully in the riding of Bonaventure and lost again in 1935 in the riding of Gaspé-Sud. Switching to the federal scene, in 1940, he ran as a National Government candidate in the Quebec riding of Bonaventure and was defeated. He was elected as an Independent candidate in the 1945 election. And was re-elected in 1949 and 1953, as a Liberal candidate. He was defeated in 1957.

Turning back to provincial politics, he was elected in 1960 as a Liberal in the riding of Matapédia. He was re-elected in 1962, 1966, 1970, and 1973. He was defeated in 1976. He was also a cabinet minister hold various posts in the Jean Lesage government, and he wrote the book Histoire et généalogie des Acadiens. In 1980, he was made a Member of the Order of Canada.

His grandson is Patrick Roy.

References

External links
 
 

1903 births
1993 deaths
Canadian male non-fiction writers
Historians of Canada
French Quebecers
Independent MPs in the Canadian House of Commons
Liberal Party of Canada MPs
Members of the House of Commons of Canada from Quebec
Members of the Order of Canada
Quebec Liberal Party MNAs
20th-century Canadian historians
Université Laval alumni